The 2012 European Athletics Championships were held in Helsinki, Finland between 27 June and 1 July 2012. This edition marks the beginning of a new two-year cycle of the European Athletics Championships which were previously held every four years.

The decision to grant the games for Helsinki was made by the European Athletics Congress on 9 November 2009. Another city that showed interest in hosting the event was Nuremberg, Germany, however Helsinki was in pole position during the whole process. This was the third time that the city had hosted the event, 1971 and 1994 being the other occasions.

Due to 2012 being an Olympic year, there were no racewalking and marathon competitions.

Event schedule

Men's results

Track

Field

Women's results

Track

Field

Stripped medals
At the Championships 9 medals was stripped, 1 men and 8 women.

Medal table

Participating nations 

 (host)

In brackets: Squad size

Broadcasting

See also
 List of stripped European Athletics Championships medals

References

External links

 Organizing Committee official website
 EAA Official website
 EAA calendar

 
European Athletics Championships
European Championships
Athletics
International sports competitions in Helsinki
2012 in European sport
2012 in Finnish sport
June 2012 sports events in Europe
July 2012 sports events in Europe
2010s in Helsinki
Athletics in Helsinki